The Brevard Symphony Orchestra performs in the King Center, Melbourne, Florida. The Center seats 1,880. BSO features an average of 65 paid musicians. The BSO offices are located at 780 South Apollo Blvd. in Melbourne.

History

In January 1954, an orchestra was needed to provide the accompaniment for a performance of The Mikado, which was being presented by the Northrop Glee Club. Thirteen musicians assembled for this purpose under the direction of Frederick Jaehne and called themselves the Brevard Light Concert Orchestra. After the conclusion of the show, they decided to remain together permanently.

Concerts were held regularly for the next several years. In 1966, the Brevard Symphony Orchestra (BSO) incorporated as a non-profit organization. Joseph Kreines took over as conductor and implemented the first season series.

In 1969, a Board of Directors from the community was formed. Maria Tunicka served as Music Director and Conductor of the BSO from 1976 to 1986. In 1986, the Board of Directors hired Kypros Markou for this position. During the 1987-88 season, Maestro Markou led the first performances of the BSO in the new Brevard Performing Arts Center (now known as the King Center for the Performing Arts), where the orchestra has been designated "orchestra-in-residence".

In the spring of 1994, Kypros Markou announced his departure. In 1995, the Board of Directors appointed Christopher Confessore as the new Music Director and Principal Conductor. Confessore continues to lead the BSO as well as currently holding the position of Associate Conductor of the
Alabama Symphony Orchestra.

For many years, the Administrative Offices of the Brevard Symphony Orchestra are located in a building located at 1500 Highland Avenue, Melbourne. This structure is known as the Winchester Symphony House and was built in 1886. There has been extensive renovation on the building over the years and it is currently listed as a Historical Site for Brevard County and the State of Florida. The BSO relocated its offices in 2018.

Educational Outreach

The Brevard Symphony Orchestra, partnering with the Brevard County School Board and through support received from local foundations and businesses, offers a free symphonic concert at the King Center each February for all 5th grade public school students.  A study guide is developed for music teachers that integrate all learning aspects of a symphony performance from biographies of the composers to seating within the orchestra, performance etiquette. This information is blended, with musical examples, into class lesson plans. For many students this is their first visit to the King Center for the Performing Arts as well as their first symphonic performance. All Study Guide materials incorporate the Sunshine State Standards and connection to Florida Comprehensive Assessment Test curriculum.  This concert is open to private and home school students.

Operations

In 2009, it had a budget of $726,000. The BSO celebrated its 65th season in 2018-2019. Christopher Confessore celebrated his 25th season as Music Director during the 2019-2020 season.

Footnotes 

Musical groups established in 1954
Orchestras based in Florida
Tourist attractions in Brevard County, Florida
Melbourne, Florida
1954 establishments in Florida